Micheweni District (Wilaya ya Micheweni in Swahili)  is one of two administrative districts of Pemba North Region in Tanzania. The district is comparable in size to the land area of Cook Islands. The district has a water border to the east, north and west by the Indian Ocean. The district is bordered to the south by Wete District. The district seat (capital) is the town of Konde. According to the 2012 census, the district has a total population of 103,816.

Administrative subdivisions

Constituencies
For parliamentary elections, Tanzania is divided into constituencies. As of the 2010 elections Micheweni District had four constituencies:
 Konde Constituency
 Mgogoni Constituency
 Micheweni Constituency
 Tumbe Constituency

Divisions

Wards
Micheweni District is administratively divided into ten wards:

 Kinowe
 Kiuyu Maziwa Ng'ombe
 Konde
 Mgogoni
 Micheweni

 Msuka
 Shumba Viamboni
 Tumbe
 Wingwi Mapofu
 Wingwi Njuguni

Education
In the 2002 census literacy in Micheweni District stood at 40 percent for those aged 5 years and above. Literacy in Swahili was 30 percent, while 19 percent were literate in English, with 9 percent overlap.

References

Districts of Pemba North Region